Thalli Pogathey may refer to:
 Thalli Pogathey (song)
 Thalli Pogathey (film)
 Thalli Pogathey (TV series)